Gazzayev is a masculine surname originating in Ossetia, its feminine counterpart is Gazzayeva. It may refer to

Azamat Gazzayev (born 1997), Russian football player
Ruslan Gazzayev (born 1991), Russian football player, son of Yuri
Valery Gazzaev (born 1954), Russian football manager and former player, father of Vladimir
Vladimir Gazzayev (born 1980), Russian football coach and a former player, son of Valery
Yuri Gazzaev (born 1960), cousin of Valery and father of Ruslan Gazzaev